Cozzo is a comune (municipality) in the Province of Pavia in the Italian region Lombardy, located about 50 km southwest of Milan and about 40 km west of Pavia. As of 31 December 2004, it had a population of 421 and an area of 17.4 km².

Cozzo borders the following municipalities: Candia Lomellina, Castelnovetto, Langosco, Rosasco, Sant'Angelo Lomellina, Valle Lomellina, Zeme.

Demographic evolution

References

Cities and towns in Lombardy